The Super Junior Tag League is a professional wrestling  tag team tournament held by New Japan Pro-Wrestling (NJPW).

Established in 2010, but  preceded by the G1 Climax Junior Heavyweight Tag League in 2001 (won by El Samurai and Jushin Thunder Liger), it is the junior heavyweight equivalent of the World Tag League for heavyweight tag teams. From 2010 to 2017, it was named the Super Junior Tag Tournament and followed a single-elimination format, before becoming the Super Junior Tag League in 2018, switching to a round-robin format. Since the tournament's inception, there were two years where the tournament did not take place—in 2011 and 2020 (due to major changes to NJPW's schedule during the COVID-19 pandemic).

Super Junior Tag Tournament (2010–2017)

2010
Super J Tag Tournament was a one-night professional wrestling tournament hosted by New Japan Pro-Wrestling and took place on May 8. Most of the wrestlers involved were signed to New Japan but did feature wrestlers from other promotions like Mascara Dorada & Valiente from Consejo Mundial de Lucha Libre, Kota Ibushi from Dramatic Dream Team, Fujita Hayato and Taro Nohashi from Michinoku Pro Wrestling, and Kushida from Smash.

El Samurai and Koji Kanemoto defeated Apollo 55 (Prince Devitt and Ryusuke Taguchi) to win the tournament and become IWGP Junior Heavyweight Tag Team Champions.

Results

2012
Super Jr. Tag Tournament 2012 was a two-night professional wrestling tournament hosted by New Japan Pro-Wrestling. The preliminary round took place on October 21 and the semi-final and final took place on November 2. The tournament utilized wrestlers mostly signed to New Japan but also included Negro Casas from Consejo Mundial de Lucha Libre, Taka Michinoku from Kaientai Dojo, and freelancer Brian Kendrick.

Time Splitters (Alex Shelley and Kushida) defeated Apollo 55 (Prince Devitt and Ryusuke Taguchi) to win the tournament and become the number one contenders to the IWGP Junior Heavyweight Tag Team Championship. They challenged the IWGP Junior Heavyweight Tag Team Champions Forever Hooligans (Alex Koslov and Rocky Romero) to a title match at Power Struggle on November 11.

Results

2013
The 2013 Super Jr. Tag Tournament was a two-night professional wrestling tournament hosted by New Japan Pro-Wrestling. The preliminary round took take place on October 25 and the semi-final and final on November 6. The debuting Young Bucks won the tournament and on November 9 at Power Struggle, defeated Taichi and Taka Michinoku to also win the IWGP Junior Heavyweight Tag Team Championship.

Results

2014
The 2014 Super Jr. Tag Tournament was a four-night professional wrestling tournament hosted by New Japan Pro-Wrestling. The preliminary round took place on October 25, the semifinals on November 1 and 2, and the final on November 3. For the third year in a row, the tournament's winning team, reDRagon, went on to also capture the IWGP Junior Heavyweight Tag Team Championship at Power Struggle.

Results

2015

The 2015 Super Jr. Tag Tournament is a three-night professional wrestling tournament hosted by New Japan Pro-Wrestling. The preliminary round took place on October 24, the semifinals on November 1, and the final on November 7 at Power Struggle.

Results

2016

The 2016 Super Jr. Tag Tournament was a four-night professional wrestling tournament hosted by New Japan Pro-Wrestling. The preliminary round took place on October 21 and 25, the semifinals on October 30, and the final on November 5 at Power Struggle.

Results

2017

The 2017 Super Jr. Tag Tournament was a four-night professional wrestling tournament hosted by New Japan Pro-Wrestling. The preliminary round took place on October 23 and 29, the semifinals on October 30, and the final on November 5 at Power Struggle.

Results

Super Junior Tag League (2018–present)

2018     
The 2018 Super Jr. Tag League was a thirteen-night professional wrestling tournament hosted by New Japan Pro-Wrestling. It featured eight teams in a single block. Block matches were held from October 16 to November 1, 2018 with the first and second placed teams advancing to the final, on November 3, at Power Struggle. Due to a three-way tie at the top of the standings, the final was a three-way tag team match between the qualified teams.

2019 
The 2019 Super Jr. Tag League is a fifteen-night professional wrestling tournament hosted by New Japan Pro-Wrestling. It features eight teams in a single block, with the first and second placed teams advancing to a final. Block matches were held from October 16 to November 1, 2019, on the Road to Power Struggle tour, and the final was held on November 3, 2019, at Power Struggle.

2021
The 2021 Super Jr. Tag League is a five-night professional wrestling tournament hosted by New Japan Pro-Wrestling. It features six teams in a single block, with the team having most points at the end of the league winning the entire tournament. In case of a tie between two or more top ranked teams in the block in terms of points tiebreakers will be held and the winner of the tournament would be decided. Block matches will be held from 7 August to 9 August and 16 August to 17 August 2021, on the Summer Struggle 2021 tour at Korakuen Hall in Tokyo, Japan. Gedo and Dick Togo forfeited their match against Ryusuke Taguchi and Master Wato due to both having to be quarantined for being in contact with EVIL, who had been in physical contact with Shingo Takagi, who tested positive for COVID. Due to this situation, official word was of giving Taguchi and Wato a bye in the tournament, thus only two league matches were held on 16 August 2021. Sho and Yoh broke up following the events of the August 16, 2021 show, causing their match against Gedo and Dick Togo to be ruled a double forfeit.

2022
The 2022 Super Jr. Tag League is a sixteen-night professional wrestling tournament hosted by New Japan Pro-Wrestling. It features ten teams in a single block, with the team having the most points at the end of the league winning the entire tournament. In case of a tie between two or more top-ranked teams in the block in terms of points, tiebreakers will be held and the winner of the tournament would be decided. Block matches will be held from November 21 to December 14, 2022, and the final will be at Sendai Sunplaza Hall in Sendai, Japan.

See also 
AJPW Junior Tag League
Nippon TV Cup Jr. Heavyweight Tag League

References

New Japan Pro-Wrestling tournaments
Tag team tournaments